The Bradley Observatory is an astronomical observatory owned and operated by Agnes Scott College. The observatory's largest telescope, the Beck Telescope, is a vintage 30 inch (750 mm) Cassegrain reflector built in 1930. The mount was built by Warner & Swasey, and the optics were built by Fecker. The telescope was originally owned and operated by an amateur astronomer, Mr. Henry Gibson. He offered the telescope for sale in Popular Astronomy magazine in 1947, seeking to upgrade his own telescope. Agnes Scott purchased it in 1947 for about $15,000 after an offer from the Soviet Union was declined for reasons related to the Cold War. For many years, the Beck telescope was the largest in the Southeast United States, only superseded when the Fernbank Observatory opened in 1972 with its  telescope.

The observatory was originally built in order to house the Beck telescope and was dedicated in 1950. It also houses classrooms, an observing plaza, faculty offices, and a 70-seat planetarium. The observatory is a contributing structure within the National Register South Candler Street-Agnes Scott College Historic District. Dr. Chris DePree is the current Director of the Bradley Observatory.

See also 
List of observatories

References

External links

 Official website
 Atlanta Clear Sky Clock Forecasts of observing conditions covering Bradley Observatory.

Infrastructure completed in 1950
Astronomical observatories in Georgia (U.S. state)
Buildings and structures in DeKalb County, Georgia
Historic district contributing properties in Georgia (U.S. state)
National Register of Historic Places in DeKalb County, Georgia
Buildings and structures on the National Register of Historic Places in Georgia (U.S. state)
University and college buildings on the National Register of Historic Places in Georgia (U.S. state)
University and college buildings completed in 1950
1950 establishments in Georgia (U.S. state)